Lago dei Monaci is a lake in the Province of Latina, Lazio, Italy. At an elevation of 1 m, its surface area is 0.9 km².

References

Lakes of Lazio
Ramsar sites in Italy